Elaine Bowers (born February 12, 1963) is a Republican member of the Kansas Senate, representing the 36th district since 2013.

Prior to her election to the Senate, Bowers was a member of the Kansas House of Representatives, representing the 107th district. She was elected in 2007. Before that, Bowers worked as an executive secretary for the Concordia Chamber of Commerce and currently is the office manager for Concordia Auto Mart Inc.

She is a member of the American Legion Auxiliary, Girl State Program, Independent Auto Dealers Association, National Auto Dealers Association and Rotary International Club.  She currently is the National Federation of Women Legislators Kansas State Director.

Committee membership
Senator Bowers currently serves on the following legislative committees:
 2015 Special Committee on Insurance
 Agriculture
 Capitol Preservation Committee
 Financial Institutions and Insurance (Vice-chair)
 Joint Committee on State-Tribal Relations
 Public Health and Welfare
 Senate Select Committee on the Kansas Public Employee Retirement System {KPERS}

Major donors
The top 5 donors to Bowers' 2008 campaign:
1. Kansas Contractors Assoc 	$1,000
2. Koch Industries 	$900 	
3. Prairie Band Potawatomi Nation 	$750 	
4. AT&T 	$500 	
5. Twin Valley Telephone Inc 	$500

References

External links
 
 Kansas Legislature - Elaine Bowers
 Kansas Votes profile
 State Surge - Legislative and voting track record
 Campaign contributions: 2006, 2008

Republican Party Kansas state senators
Republican Party members of the Kansas House of Representatives
Women state legislators in Kansas
Living people
People from Concordia, Kansas
People from Beloit, Kansas
1963 births
21st-century American politicians
21st-century American women politicians